is the sixth story arc of the Japanese manga series JoJo's Bizarre Adventure, written and illustrated by Hirohiko Araki. Set near Port St. Lucie, Florida in 2011, the story follows Jotaro Kujo's estranged daughter Jolyne Cujoh as she serves a 15-year sentence at Green Dolphin Street Prison. When her father's Stand ability and memories are stolen by a follower of Dio Brando, Jolyne takes it upon herself to save her father, break out of prison, and put an end to the thief's grand machinations. It was serialized in Shueisha's Weekly Shōnen Jump from January 1, 2000, to April 21, 2003, and was collected into 17 tankōbon volumes. It was preceded by Golden Wind and followed by Steel Ball Run. A 38-episode anime adaptation, JoJo's Bizarre Adventure: Stone Ocean, was released on Netflix from December 2021 to December 2022. Viz Media began to digitally release the manga in English through its Shonen Jump service in January 2022.

Plot
Jotaro Kujo's daughter, Jolyne Cujoh, is convicted of second-degree murder and sentenced to 15 years in Green Dolphin Street Prison, having been framed for the crime by her boyfriend. Prior to her incarceration, Jolyne pricks her finger on a pendant given to her by her father, which is revealed to contain a fragment of a Stand-bestowing Arrow. Jolyne manifests her Stand Stone Free before being visited by Jotaro, who attempts to break his daughter out while revealing that she was framed by a follower of Dio Brando. But it turned out to be a trap set for Jotaro as a Stand named Whitesnake extracts Jotaro's memories and Star Platinum in the form of two discs, leaving him in a coma. Jolyne realizes the extent of her father's love for her and resolves to recover his discs from Whitesnake's user. She is joined by Emporio Alniño, a boy born in prison whose mother was killed by Whitesnake, Ermes Costello, who came to prison to murder her sister's killer, and Foo Fighters, a plankton colony Whitesnake gave sentience to guard his stolen Stand discs. They are soon joined by two inmates: a weather-controlling amnesiac, named Weather Report, and Narciso Anasui, who has an unrequited love for Jolyne.

Whitesnake's user is eventually revealed to be a prison chaplain named Enrico Pucci. Pucci sought Jotaro's memories to learn the details of Dio's written plan to establish heaven on Earth, which Jotaro had destroyed twenty-two years earlier after killing Dio. After retrieving Jotaro's Stand disc and sending it to the Speedwagon Foundation, Jolyne discovers that Whitesnake has used a subordinate to revive one of Dio's bones, which eventually absorbs the souls of several prisoners and forms a homunculus named the Green Baby. Jolyne's group seizes the Green Baby as bait for Whitesnake's user, but Foo Fighters and Anasui are mortally wounded in the ensuing battle, with Foo Fighters using the last of her strength to save Anasui's life and retrieve Jotaro's memory disc. Pucci successfully fuses with the Green Baby and leaves the prison for Cape Canaveral, where the new moon is expected to bring about the heaven Pucci seeks. 

Jolyne and her allies escape from prison to pursue Pucci to Orlando, Florida, arranging to give Jotaro's memory disc to the Speedwagon Foundation to revive him while dealing with Pucci's final subordinates, three illegitimate sons of Dio. Weather Report eventually regains his own memory disc and remembers his tragic past as Wes Bluemarine, Pucci's long-lost twin brother. Weather Report unleashes his ability's full extent on Orlando before dying in a confrontation with Pucci, using his final moments to extract his Stand disc for his allies to use. As Pucci reaches Cape Canaveral, Whitesnake undergoes an evolution into the gravity-manipulating C-Moon and overpowers Jolyne's group. Though Jotaro arrives in time to save his daughter, Pucci realizes that he can use C-Moon to replicate the new moon's gravity, allowing him to complete his Stand's evolution into Made in Heaven, which can exponentially accelerate time. The group make a desperate stand against Pucci's completed Stand, but most of the group is soon eliminated. Jolyne sacrifices herself to allow Emporio to escape as the sole survivor.

Pucci’s Stand accelerates time to the end of the universe, with Pucci using a new cycle of time to create a new reality where all survivors from the previous universe have subconscious precognition of their fate while those who died will not return. Pucci attempts to kill Emporio to tie up loose ends, only to inadvertently insert Weather Report's Stand disc into the child's head. Pucci accelerates time once more, but Emporio uses Weather Report to increase the concentration of the surrounding oxygen to a lethal amount. A poisoned and paralyzed Pucci, unable to stop his Stand from accelerating time again, pleads with Emporio to spare him until he can make Made in Heaven's effect permanent. Emporio refuses and declares that fate follows the path of justice as Weather Report punches Pucci's head into the floor.

Following the second rebirth of the universe, Emporio finds himself at a gas station near Green Dolphin Street Prison. He encounters a hitchhiker named Eldis who bears an uncanny resemblance to Ermes. As it begins to rain, the two offered a ride by a couple named Irene and Anakiss, resembling Jolyne and Anasui, who are on their way to meet Irene's father for his marital blessing. Emporio tearfully introduces himself as they depart in Anakiss' car, picking up another hitchhiker resembling Weather Report before driving off in the rain.

Characters

Jolyne Cujoh is an inmate at Green Dolphin Street Prison, and is the daughter of the Stardust Crusaders main protagonist Jotaro Kujo. Her Stand is Stone Free, which allows her to unravel her body into multiple threads.
Jotaro Kujo returns from Stardust Crusaders  and Diamond is Unbreakable as Jolyne's father. Now a middle-aged man, he arrives at Green Dolphin Street Prison to help Jolyne escape prison, only to have his Stand and memories stolen from him. His Stand is Star Platinum, a powerful close-ranged Stand with immense strength, precision, speed, and the ability to stop time.
 is an inmate who intentionally had herself incarcerated to take revenge on the gangster Sports Maxx for killing her sister. She acquires the Stand Kiss, which allows her to place stickers on whatever she wants duplicated until the sticker is removed, inflicting damage from the duplicate and the original merging back together.
, often shortened to F.F., is a sapient being consisting of plankton. It is its own Stand, with the ability to control the plankton colony as one being or individually, as well as the ability to seal wounds using plankton or possess someone's body. After allying with Jolyne, the Stand assumes the appearance of a deceased prisoner named Atroe.
 is a boy born to an unknown inmate in Green Dolphin Street Prison. His Stand, Burning Down the House, has the ability to manifest objects which no longer exist, such as those within a former version of the prison building. Following his incarcerated mother's death at Whitesnake's hands, he secretly lives in a ghost room that he created, together with Weather Report and Narciso Anasui.
, born Domenico Pucci and raised as Wes Bluemarine, is an amnesiac inmate who aides Jolyne at Emporio's request. With no memory of his true name, he goes by the name of his Stand, which allows him to manipulate the weather and the atmosphere. Upon regaining his memories, Weather awakens a hidden ability known as Heavy Weather, which gradually transforms people into snails through subliminal messages embedded within rainbows.
 is an inmate who is obsessively in love with Jolyne and wishes to marry her, despite the fact that she is clearly not interested in him. His Stand, Diver Down, allows him to phase himself or his Stand into objects, or into others' bodies to absorb damage dealt to them. Diver Down can then release this energy outward as an offensive counterattack.
 is a Roman Catholic priest and Jolyne's warden of the Green Dolphin Street Prison, and is one of Dio's last remaining followers. Pucci uses the Stand Whitesnake, which allows him to extracting people's memories and Stand abilities in the form of compact discs; he can also insert discs into others, imbuing them with information, Stand abilities, or specific orders. He can also remove senses with discs, such as vision. Whitesnake, after Pucci fuses with the Green Baby, eventually evolves into C-Moon, giving Pucci the ability to reverse the gravity of the area around him, as well as the gravity of anything the Stand touches, which can turn an object or person inside out. C-Moon eventually evolves once more into Made in Heaven, gaining the power to gradually speed up time until a new parallel universe is reached. Pucci seeks to avenge Dio and continue his plans to "attain heaven" by wiping out the Joestar family and rewriting reality into Dio's image.
The Green Baby is a homunculus created by Sports Maxx using a bone given to Pucci by Dio. After absorbing the souls of thirty-six prisoners, the homunculus gains a visible form and awakens. In its initial form, the Green Baby possesses a passive ability to absorb the souls of those nearby by turning them into flowers when they are hit by sunlight. After awakening, it develops the Stand Green, Green Grass of Home, which automatically protects it by gradually shrinking any perceived threat as they move toward it, effectively preventing physical contact by invoking the dichotomy paradox.
The  are convicted felons sentenced to maximum-security incarceration for their crimes. During Jolyne's incarceration, a number of the prisoners are recruited by Pucci to eliminate her and her allies, sometimes in exchange for favors such as recommendation for parole.
 is Jolyne's cellmate at Green Dolphin Street Prison, serving a twelve-year sentence for arson, attempted murder, and parole violation. Her Stand, Goo Goo Dolls, allows her to shrink people near her. Gwess plots to use her Stand to plan her escape, forcing Jolyne to act as a scout; following her betrayal of Jolyne and subsequent defeat, she unsuccessfully attempts to regain Jolyne's trust by acting servile toward her.
 is an inmate at Green Dolphin Street Prison serving an eight-year sentence for murder. He was a former soldier and a proficient sniper before becoming nearly blind due to cataracts. He is one of the last remaining followers of Dio, and plots to kill Jotaro and his daughter out of his fanatical devotion to the late vampire. He wields the Stand Manhattan Transfer, which acts in combination with Johngalli A.'s perception of wind currents to ricochet bullets fired from his sniper rifle.
 is an inmate at Green Dolphin Street Prison serving an eight-year sentence for accidentally murdering a woman in the middle of committing suicide. Though McQueen has gained a position as a janitor and amassed a sizable fortune, he has also developed suicidal tendencies of his own; recognizing McQueen's potential for evil, Whitesnake gives him the Stand Highway to Hell, which causes its victim to share the user's self-inflicted injuries.
 is an inmate convicted for armed robbery who becomes a pawn of Enrico Pucci. She is given the Stand Marilyn Manson, the Debt Collector, which automatically collects the debt incurred when her target loses a bet.
 is an inmate at Green Dolphin Street Prison serving a five-year sentence for hijacking a tanker and murdering his teacher. On Pucci's orders, he battles Jolyne and Weather Report in hopes of retrieving Jotaro's Stand disc. Lang Rangler possesses the Stand Jumpin' Jack Flash, which can nullify the force of gravity upon anything or anyone he or his victims touch.
 is a gangster convicted and incarcerated at Green Dolphin Street Jail for tax evasion and extortion. Many of his crimes were unable to be proven in his conviction, including his murder of Ermes' sister. As part of Pucci's plan, Sports Maxx is given the Stand Limp Bizkit, which can bring any organism back to life as an invisible zombie.
Guccio is an inmate serving a five-year sentence for sexual assault and theft. He is sent to the Ultra Security House Unit by Pucci to help assassinate Jolyne and prepare for the Green Baby's birth. Whitesnake gives him the Stand Survivor, a Stand that travels along wet surfaces and uses a small electrical signal to greatly increase the aggression of its victims. Guccio himself is not affected, as the fact that fights broke out around him without his involvement during his youth made him compatible with its ability.
Kenzou is an elderly cult leader who was sentenced to Green Dolphin Street Prison for 280 years after starting his own cult and organizing a mass suicide. He is a confident martial artist and assassin who hopes to regain his former glory by gaining followers within prison. In addition, he wields the stand Dragon's Dream, which points in the direction of lucky and unlucky areas in accordance to feng shui; the Stand acts as a neutral party, however, as its divinations are visible to both Kenzou and his opponent.
D an G is an inmate in Green Dolphin Street Prison serving a twenty-year sentence for murder. D an G was a firm believer in Nostradamus's predictions; believing that the world would end in the year 2000, he shot several people he personally disliked and used his status as a police officer to cover up his crimes. As ex-police officers are often murdered in prison, he was placed in the Ultra Security House Unit for his own safety upon his conviction. He wields the automatic, sentient, and near-indestructible Stand Yo-Yo Ma, which acts in a servile manner toward its target while subtly dissolving them with its acidic saliva.
The  are illegitimate children of the late vampire Dio Brando and the brothers of Giorno Giovanna. Assembled in a hospital in Orlando, Florida due to the influence of fate, the three are recruited by Pucci and awaken their own latent Stand abilities.
 is a drug addict who lost consciousness after using an unknown drug, forcing him to be brought to the hospital. He wields the Stand Bohemian Rhapsody, which allows him to summon fictional characters with the ability to swap souls with real people. Seeking revenge upon the world for his miserable life, Ungalo gladly lets his ability run wild across the world.
 is a meek and anxious man who was admitted to the hospital following a car crash. In his youth, he suffered from constant panic attacks and physical afflictions; after Pucci awakens his Stand, his afflictions are cured and he becomes more confident. Rikiel wields the Stand Sky High, which allows him to control a colony of rod-shaped cryptids that can absorb body heat from their victims.
 ran away from an abusive home at age thirteen and was falsely accused and convicted of stealing a pair of shoes that seemingly fell out of the sky, similarly to Stanley Yelnats in the novel Holes. After being released, a botched burglary resulted in him jumping off a six-story building, causing him to be taken to the hospital. Donatello Versus wields the Stand Under World, which allows him to unearth memories of events and people from underground, forcing his victims to relive them. Upon his defeat, he betrays Pucci by returning Weather Report's memory disc to him, only to be caught up in the ensuing chaos and left to die by the escaping priest.
 is the ruthless chief of Green Dolphin Street Jail. While speaking in public, he converses with and speaks through an alligator puppet named Charlotte, who possesses a much harsher personality.
 is a corrections officer in Green Dolphin Street Prison. He is sent to the Ultra Security House Unit by Pucci, where Guccio's Survivor causes him to become berserk and aggressive. Whitesnake gives him the Stand Planet Waves, which has the ability to summon small meteors from the sky.
, also known as Miu Miu, is the chief guard at Green Dolphin Street Prison. Pucci hired her to kill Jolyne should she attempt to escape the prison. Miuccia is able to prevent Stand users from escaping with her Stand Jail House Lock, which allows her to cripple her victims' memory to the point of only being able to remember three things at a time.
Dio makes a posthumous appearance in various flashbacks. While traveling around the world in the 1980s, Dio meets Pucci and helps him to attain his Stand. Throughout their subsequent meetings, Dio informs Pucci of his plan to achieve what he believes to be heaven. Dio eventually writes down the steps to attain heaven in a diary, but the diary is read and destroyed by Jotaro after Dio's death during the events of Stardust Crusaders. However, Pucci is able to use Whitesnake to steal Jotaro's memories of the diary and continue Dio's plan in his absence.

Volumes

2008 release

Related media

Anime

The anime adaptation of Stone Ocean was personally announced by series creator Hirohiko Araki on the "JoJo's Bizarre Adventure the Animation Special Event: JOESTAR Inherited Soul" live stream in April 2021. The first twelve episodes premiered on Netflix worldwide on December 1, 2021; episodes 13–24 were released on September 1, 2022, and episodes 25–38 were released on December 1, 2022.

One-shot manga
, a one-shot spin-off manga by Shō Aimoto, the creator of Kemono Jihen, was published by Shueisha in their seinen manga magazine Ultra Jump on December 18, 2021.

Reception
Kono Manga ga Sugoi! recommended the series, and called Jolyne a distinctive character within the JoJo's Bizarre Adventure franchise. In a 2015 poll on Charapedia, Japanese readers ranked Stone Ocean as having the seventeenth most shocking ending of all time in manga and anime.

Notes

References

2021 manga
Comics about the end of the universe
Comics set in Florida
Fiction set in 2011
Fiction set in 2012
JoJo's Bizarre Adventure
Prisons in anime and manga
Shueisha manga
Shōnen manga
Viz Media manga